Asgard is the second largest multi-ringed basin (large impact crater) on Jupiter's moon Callisto. It is named after Asgard, the realm of the gods in Norse mythology. The central part of Asgard is dominated by the domed Doh impact crater.

A smaller multi-ring structure is superposed on the northern part of Asgard. Utgard is the fourth largest multi-ring feature on Callisto. A substantial part of the central region of Utgard is covered with deposits from the relatively young Burr crater.

References

Surface features on Callisto (moon)
Impact craters on Jupiter's moons